Yaylacık is a village in the Nurdağı District, Gaziantep Province, Turkey. The village is populated by Kurds of the Atma tribe and had a population of 86 in 2022.

References

Villages in Nurdağı District
Kurdish settlements in Gaziantep Province